Roy Frank "RJ" Mitte III (born August 21, 1992) is an American actor, best known for playing Walter "Flynn" White Jr. on the AMC series Breaking Bad (2008–2013). Like his character on the show, he has cerebral palsy. After moving to Hollywood in 2006, he began training with a personal talent manager. They sought acting opportunities where his disability would serve to educate viewers, which led him to audition for the role in Breaking Bad.

Early life
Mitte was born in Jackson, Mississippi. He was delivered by emergency caesarean and was not breathing at the time of his birth, which resulted in permanent brain damage. He was adopted a few weeks later by Roy Frank Mitte Jr. and Dyna Mitte, who later separated. He was diagnosed with cerebral palsy at the age of three, and doctors put his legs in casts for six months in an attempt to straighten his feet.

Mitte was fitted with leg braces and used crutches throughout most of his childhood; however, over time, his body became stronger through sports and exercise; he no longer needed any walking devices by his teenage years. In 2006, he moved with his family to Los Angeles, where his younger sister Lacianne Carriere had received an offer for a role in a film project.

Mitte was raised by his mother following the separation of his parents. After his mother became paralyzed, Mitte became financially responsible at age 13 for the family, which by then also included his sister who was born when he was 11 years old. As of 2015, he was still financially responsible for his mother and sister.

Career

After receiving several roles as an extra, including in the Disney series Hannah Montana, Mitte became interested in films and decided to take acting lessons. Shortly after, he was offered the role of Walter White Jr., a character who also has cerebral palsy, in the AMC series Breaking Bad.  At the 2013 Media Access Awards, Mitte received the SAG-AFTRA Harold Russell Award for his portrayal of Walter White Jr. on the series and also presented the eponymous RJ Mitte Diversity Award to deaf actor Ryan Lane. The Screen Actors Guild named Mitte as the spokesman for actors with disabilities and he is the representative of Inclusion in the Arts and Media of Performers with Disabilities, which employs artists with disabilities.

He starred in the short horror film Stump in 2011. That same year, he worked as executive producer of the documentary Vanished: The Tara Calico Story, about the disappearance of Tara Calico. Mitte was cast in the 2012 thriller film House of Last Things.

Mitte appeared in the 2013 music video for "Dead Bite" by rapcore band Hollywood Undead. He also appeared in the video for "If I Get High" by Nothing But Thieves in 2016. In January 2014, he began a recurring role on the ABC Family drama series Switched at Birth portraying Campbell, a premed student paralyzed from a snowboarding accident who uses a wheelchair.

On 17 November 2015, Mitte was announced to be a presenter as part of British Channel 4's coverage of the 2016 Rio Summer Paralympics.

Activism
Mitte appeared on the cover of the February/March 2015 issue of Neurology Now (published by the American Academy of Neurology). The issue included a short biography and his views on cerebral palsy, bullying, and his acting career. He is also a celebrity ambassador for United Cerebral Palsy.

Modeling 
Mitte modeled for a spring 2014 Gap ad campaign. Mitte walked the catwalk for Vivienne Westwood in June 2015.

Filmography

Film

Television

Music videos

Awards and nominations

References

External links
 
RJ Mitte discusses Breaking Bad at AMCTV.com, 2009
RJ Mitte — Breaking Bad Is Good Interview with ABILITY Magazine

1992 births
21st-century American male actors
American adoptees
American male child actors
American male film actors
American male television actors
Living people
Male actors from Mississippi
Models with disabilities
People with cerebral palsy
People from Jackson, Mississippi
Actors with disabilities
Television presenters with disabilities